Gianlucca Fatecha Benitez (born 17 January 1998) is a Paraguayan footballer who plays as a midfielder for Peruvian First Division side Cienciano.

Career

Fatecha started his career with Olimpia, Paraguay's most successful club, where he made 11 league appearances and scored 0 goals.

In 2017, Fatecha was sent on loan to the youth academy of Anderlecht, the most successful team in Belgium.

In 2020, he signed for Paraguayan side 12 de Octubre.

References

External links
 
 

Living people
1998 births
Paraguayan footballers
Paraguayan expatriate footballers
Sportspeople from Asunción
Association football midfielders
Club Olimpia footballers
12 de Octubre Football Club players
River Plate (Asunción) footballers
Club Sol de América footballers
Paraguayan Primera División players
Expatriate footballers in Belgium